Amorbia cocori is a species of moth of the family Tortricidae. It is found in Costa Rica, where it is found on the Pacific and Caribbean slopes at altitudes below 650 meters.

The length of the forewings is 11–13 mm for males and 16–17 mm for females. The ground colour of the forewings is light brown, the basal to median fascia golden honey and the postmedian to the subterminal area with a pale yellow band. The hindwings have straw yellow scaling. Adults have been recorded on wing from December to March and from July to August.

Etymology
The species name refers to the locality where one of the paratypes was collected, Estación Cocori, Limón in Costa Rica. Cocorí is also the name of a famous children’s book by the Costa Rican writer Joaquín Gutiérrez.

References

Moths described in 2007
Sparganothini
Moths of Central America